The 2015 Men's European Volleyball League was the 12th edition of the annual Men's European Volleyball League, which features men's national volleyball teams from twelve European countries.

A preliminary league round was played from July 3 to August 9, and the final four tournament, which was held at Walbrzych, Poland.

Slovenia defeated Macedonia 3–0 in the final.

Teams

League round
All times are local.

Pool A

|}

Leg 1

|}

Leg 2

|}

Leg 3

|}

Leg 4

|}

Leg 5

|}

Leg 6

|}

Pool B

|}

Leg 1

|}

Leg 2

|}

Leg 3

|}

Leg 4

|}

Leg 5

|}

Final four
The top placed team from each group and the best second-placed team qualified for the final four. The fourth participant was the organizer of the tournament.

Qualified teams
 (Host)

Bracket

Semifinals

|}

Third place game

|}

Final

|}

Final standings

Awards

Most Valuable Player
  Dejan Vinčič
Best Setter
  Dejan Vinčič
Best Outside Spikers
  Nikola Gjorgiev
  Klemen Čebulj

Best Middle Blockers
  Jan Nowakowski
  Ardo Kreek
Best Opposite Spiker
  Jovica Simovski
Best Libero
  Damian Wojtaszek
Fair Play Award

References

External links
Official website

2015 Men
Men's European Volleyball League
International volleyball competitions hosted by Poland